Vodohod is a Russian cruise company and river cruise line operator, founded in 2004 by the Volga Shipping Company and named after Ivan Kulibin’s “water-going vessel” or “water-goer”. The company has its headquarters in Moscow and Saint Petersburg, Russia. After merging with Volga Flot Tour company operates more than 50 passenger ships along rivers of Volga, Don, Kama, the Moscow and Volga-Don canals, the Volga-Baltic Waterway, Northern-Western rivers, lakes Ladoga and Onega.

The company is also planning the launch of two, twin Finnish-built expedition ships under the codename Project Vega  for delivery in 2021 and 2022.

The company is in the top three companies  (along with Mosturflot and Infoflot) of the consolidated Russian river cruise market (the first five companies carry about 80% of the total passenger traffic ).

History 
Since 1999, a subsidiary of the Volga Shipping Company, the river tourism company Volga-Flot-Tour, has been established. This date is considered the year of foundation of the cruise company.

In 2011, there was a consolidation of companies into private limited company Vodohod, which were in the shipping passenger division of the international transport holding UCL Holdingrude — Volgo-Balt Transport Holding (VBTH): "Volga-Flot-Tour", private limited company Vodohod-Moscow (a full-cycle shipping and travel company ) and private limited company Vodohod-St. Petersburg (a cruise shipping company and travel agent for sea and river cruises ). In 2017, the company withdrew from the UCLH holding.

"Vodohod-Saint-Petersburg" was established in 2004 on the basis of the St. Petersburg branch of Volga-Fleet-Tour PLC and operated in the North-West of Russia. In 2006, the company "Vodohod-Saint-Petersburg" transported about 400 thousand passengers by the high-speed fleet to the historical suburbs of St. Petersburg.

Indicators 
According to Kommersant, in 2016 (as part of VBTH) Vodohod transported 497,000 passengers. According to SPARK, the revenue of Vodohod in 2015 according to RAS is 2.6 billion rubles, net profit is 55 million rubles.

Owners 
Co-owners of the company are Riskhat Bahautdinov  and Vladimir Kasanenko (100% of shares). The general director of the company is Rishate Bagautdin.

Vodohod cruise ships

The fleet of the company "Vodohod" has:

 27 cruise fleet units (25 cruise ships in operation);
 9 units of the passenger high-speed fleet of the "Meteor" type;
 9 units of the pleasant fleet of the types "Moscow", "Neva" and "Otdikh".
From 2017, commissioned by the company at the "Krasnaya Sormovo" steam-ship of mixed swimming has laid on the rivers and seas "Prince Vladimir" — the second vessel of the PV300 project, developed by the company "Marine Engineering Bureau—CPb". This is the first passenger ship built on the Russian shipyard over the past 60 years. The operation of the four-panel liner began, but he received another name, "Karim Mustay". The vessel is calculated on 342 passengers.

Courts go under the Russian flag, are owned by the company. The home ports of the ships sailing under the Russian flag are Nizhny Novgorod and Saint Petersburg.

Valerian Kuybyshev class

Vladimir Ilyich class

Dmitriy Furmanov class

Anton Chekhov class

Maksim Gorkiy class

See also
Volga Shipping Company

References

External links
Vodohod

Cruise lines
Travel and holiday companies of Russia
Companies established in 2004
Shipping companies of Russia
Companies based in Moscow
River cruise companies